The Socialist Party of Malaysia (PSM, ;), is a socialist political party in Malaysia and an offshoot of Parti Rakyat Malaysia, which originally upheld the same ideology. In its first ten years following its founding in 1998, the party was denied registration as a political party by the Federal Government of Malaysia. The original reason given was that PSM is a threat to national security. However, the Home Ministry gave them the green light in June 2008.

The party stands on the left-wing and places strong emphasis on indigenous rights for the Orang Asli, workers' rights, LGBT rights, environmentalism and egalitarianism.

History

The end of PSRM (1990) 
The last socialist party to exist in Malaysia, Parti Sosialis Rakyat Malaysia, reverted their name to Parti Rakyat Malaysia in 1990 before merging with Parti Keadilan Rakyat in 2003.

Formation of PSM (1990–1998) 
In 1991, several grassroots based organisations working with the urban and rural poor in Malaysia started to form an alliance. In 1994, they staged a massive Labor Day demonstration at the heart of Kuala Lumpur surprising many people. The last major demonstration called by the working class in the capital city was in the 1970s.

In 1995, these grassroots organisation who already had their strong support among the plantation workers, the urban poor, and industrial workers formed an alliance and the idea for a political party to represent the aspirations of the poor and the marginalised was mooted. The election results in 1995 hastened this process and after years of discussion and consolidations, it was finally agreed that a party with socialist ideology was imminent to liberate the masses from their current conditions.

With this in mind, the groups took more than two and the half years to draft the party's constitution, which was ready by the end of 1997. After further consultation with the masses, on 1 May 1998, the new party known as the Socialist Party of Malaysia was officially put for registration.

Legal status 
The Federal Government had refused to recognise PSM since the latter's formation. The government had rejected the party's application to register as a political party alleging that PSM was a threat to national security. However, because the right to form a political party is guaranteed in the constitution, the PSM took the government and the Home Minister to court for abusing their power. Although the Court of Appeal dismissed the national security argument on 16 August 2006, it upheld a separate reason to deny the registration of the PSM as a political party. PSM then filed an appeal against the Court of Appeal's decision to the Federal Court of Malaysia. However, on 17 June 2008, the Home Ministry approved PSM's application as a political party just before Federal Court proceedings started, ending a 10-year dispute.

1999 general election 
In 1999, the party decided to contest in the year's general election. Since PSM was not registered, it had to contest under some other party's logo. In 1999, the candidates contested under a Democratic Action Party's ticket. The main intention was to popularise the party. The party lost in its seat but managed to reduce the opponent's majority by 10,000 votes.

2004 general election 

In the 2004 general election, PSM had to contest on the logo of another party, Parti Keadilan Nasional (now known as Parti Keadilan Rakyat).

2008 general election 
Three PSM members contested in the 2008 general election under the Keadilan ticket and one as an independent. Two of these candidates won PSM's first ever political seats. Candidate Michael Jeyakumar Devaraj won PSM's first ever federal parliamentary seat by defeating then president of Malaysian Indian Congress and long-serving Minister of Works Samy Vellu in Sungai Siput. PSM's president Mohd Nasir Hashim won the Kota Damansara seat in the Selangor state legislative assembly. Although S. Arutchelvan lost, PSM's election campaigning resulted in an increase in membership in Semenyih. The remaining member who contested Jelapang as an independent was M. Sarasvathy.

2013 general election 
The two PSM incumbents, Michael Jeyakumar Devaraj and Nasir Hashim, recontested their seats in the 2013 general election under Keadilan. Jeyakumar retained the PSM's parliamentary seat of Sungai Siput but Nasir, the PSM's president, lost the Kota Damansara state seat to a United Malays National Organisation (UMNO) candidate. Another two PSM members, S. Arutchelvan and M. Sarasvathy, also recontested the same seats but this time under the PSM ticket.

2018 general election 
For the 2018 general election, PSM competed in their largest turnout (~2% of available Parliamentary + State seats); this consisted of five federal constituencies and 14 state constituencies. All PSM candidates for this general election competed under PSM name and logo, as opposed to the previous elections. Unlike in previous elections, the then chairman Nasir Hashim announced that he was not running in the 2018 election.

PSM did not succeed in winning any seats this election and lost the Sungai Siput parliamentary seat it held since 2008.

Leadership 
Chairman
Dr Michael Jeyakumar Devaraj
Deputy Chairman
S. Arutchelvan
Secretary-General
Sivarajan Arumugam
Assistant Secretary-General
K.S. Bawani
Treasurer
Soh Sook Hua
Assistant Treasurer
Madhavi
Central Executive Committee members
 Khairul Nizam @ Aduka
Julius Choo Chon Kai
 Mohana Rani Rasiah
 Letchimi Devi
 Sivaranjani Manickam
 Karthiges
 Chong Yee Shan
 Parameiswary Elumalai
 Mahira Muliotoh
 Nalini Elumalai
 Kohila
 Cheong Huei Ting
PSM Youth Chief
Arveent Kathirtchelvan

Ideology 
According to their official website, PSM is only eight years old but has working experience with the masses that goes back more than fifteen years. Over the years, the party's three main front organisations had established more than a hundred sub-fronts. PSM strength lies in its work done with the masses especially the plantation workers, the urban poor, the Industrial workers and the peasants. The party also collaborates with the progressive student movement. PSM remain today perhaps the only party in Malaysia taking a class line and highlighting the plight of the poor from low wages, forceful eviction to retrenchment. The party has also made some inroads into organising union in the last two year and have working committees in around 50 factories throughout the country. While civil and political protest are carried out by the mainstream political parties, PSM continues to support and organise pickets, strike and demonstration among the working class.

Seven-Point Manifesto 
PSM has a seven-point manifesto which lists the following policies:

 Workers' rights will be safeguarded (e.g. minimum wage, automatic recognition of workers unions and 90-day maternal leave).
 The eradication of neo-liberal policies (e.g. halting privatisation of health care, education and other public necessities).
 Stopping the Free Trade Agreement with western imperial powers.
 Provide comfortable and humane housing for both rural and urban inhabitants.
 Stopping racial and religious politics to foster greater unity among the people.
 Eradication of corruption and abuse of power.
 Stopping the destruction of the environment.

General election results

State election results

See also 
:Category:Socialist Party of Malaysia politicians
 List of political parties in Malaysia
 Politics of Malaysia

References

External links 
 
 
 Photo gallery
 Red Ink: Socialist Youth blog

Political parties in Malaysia
Socialist parties in Malaysia
Socialist parties in Asia
1998 establishments in Malaysia
Political parties established in 1998